Echinotriton is a genus of salamanders in the family Salamandridae.

Species
It contains the following species:

References

Newts
Amphibians of Asia
Amphibian genera
Taxonomy articles created by Polbot